Index Township is an inactive township in Cass County, in the U.S. state of Missouri.

Index Township was established in 1872, taking its name from Index, Missouri.

References

Townships in Missouri
Townships in Cass County, Missouri